Eric Hammer (born February 2, 1967), known professionally as Doc Hammer,  is an American voice actor, musician, writer and artist. He performed in the gothic rock bands Requiem in White from 1985 to 1995 and Mors Syphilitica from 1995 to 2002, both with his then-wife Lisa Hammer. His film credits include a number of Lisa's projects—released through their own production company Blessed Elysium—in which he participated as a writer, actor, composer, designer, and visual effects artist. He also composed the music for the 1997 film A, B, C... Manhattan. He and Christopher McCulloch are the co-creators, writers, and editors of the animated television series The Venture Bros. (2004–2020), in which Hammer voices several recurring characters including Billy Quizboy, Henchman 21, Dr. Mrs. The Monarch, and Dermott Fictel. The show is produced through Hammer and McCulloch's company Astro-Base Go. Hammer is also the guitarist and lead vocalist of the band Weep, which formed in 2008. In 2021, Hammer founded the band Pageant Girls with vocalist Ivy Jaff.

Early life
Hammer was born in Ledyard, Connecticut. He has stated that his hair naturally grows in both black and blonde, a condition he attributes to "a pigmentation problem or a birthmark or something. But my hair is naturally like this... Kinda. Because my eyebrows are black, I used to dye my whole head that color. Also, I used to enjoy looking like Dracula for some asinine reason." He lives with Ménière's disease, a disorder of the inner ear that can affect hearing and balance. He is a self-taught oil painter.

Personal life
He adopted the pseudonym "Doc" in the mid-2000s.

In July 2018, Dark Horse Books, a division of Dark Horse Comics, published Go Team Venture!: The Art and Making of The Venture Bros. The book, co-authored by Hammer, Christopher McCulloch, and Kenneth Plume details the entire history of the creation of The Venture Bros. episode by episode from seasons one through six.

Filmography

Film

Television

References

External links

1967 births
Living people
American male musicians
American male painters
American male television writers
American male voice actors
American television writers
People from Ledyard, Connecticut
Screenwriters from Connecticut
21st-century American painters
People with Ménière's Disease